The Roman Catholic Diocese of Dassa–Zoumé is a diocese located in the city of Dassa-Zoumé in the Ecclesiastical province of Cotonou in Benin. Since 12 of February 2015 the diocese has a new bishop and is no more a vacant see (sede vacante).

History
 June 10, 1995: Established as Diocese of Dassa-Zoumé from the Diocese of Abomey

Leadership
 Bishops of Dassa-Zoumé (Roman rite)
 Bishop Antoine Ganyé (June 10, 1995 - August 21, 2010); appointed Metropolitan Archbishop of Cotonou
 Mgr François Gnonhossou, SMA (February 12, 2015 -)

See also
 Roman Catholicism in Benin

References

External links
 GCatholic.org 

Dassa-Zoume
Christian organizations established in 1995
Roman Catholic dioceses and prelatures established in the 20th century
Dassa-Zoume, Roman Catholic Diocese of